Elfriede Martha Abbe (1919–2012) was an American sculptor, wood engraver and botanical illustrator, often displaying nature and simple country living inspired by her Upstate New York home. A self-publisher, Abbe created numerous hand-printed books, which she printed on a printing press in her studio.

Personal life and teaching

Elfriede Abbe was born in Washington, D.C. in 1919. Her statue "The Hunter" was featured at the 1939 New York World's Fair in New York. She graduated from Cornell University in 1940, earning a degree in architecture, and attended Syracuse University. From 1942 until her retirement in 1974 she was an illustrator at Cornell. After retiring from Cornell, she lived and worked in Vermont. She lived in Manchester until her death in 2012. During her retirement, she published on art and natural history, continuing to produce artwork throughout her life.

Notable awards
Barrett-Colea Prize; National Sculpture Society
Elliot Liskin Award; Salmagundi Club
Gold; National Arts Club
Gold; Pen & Brush
Fellowship; The Louis Comfort Tiffany Foundation

Notable collections
Carnegie Mellon University, Pittsburgh, Pennsylvania
Cornell University, Ithaca, New York
Metropolitan Museum of Art, New York City
National Gallery of Art, Washington, D.C.
New York Botanical Garden, Bronx, New York
Smith College, Northampton, Massachusetts
Yale University, New Haven, Connecticut

Published works
Abbe, Elfriede. The Plants of Virgil's Georgics: Commentary and Woodcuts By Elfriede Abbe. Ithaca: Cornell University Press, 1965. 
Abbe, Elfriede. Seven Irish Tales. Ithaca, NY: Cornell University Press, 1957.
Abbe, Elfriede. Mushrooms: Wood Engravings in Color. Elfriede Abbe, 1970.
Abbe, Elfriede. How Prints Are Made. Manchester, Vt.: South Vermont Art Center Press, 1971.
Abbe, Elfriede. An Introduction to Hand-made Paper. Manchester, Vt.: Southern Vermont Art Center Press, 1972.
Abbe, Elfriede. The Fern Herbal: Including the Ferns, the Horsetails, and the Club Mosses. Ithaca: Comstock, 1981.

References

External links
Elfriede Abbe papers, 1948–1978 in the collection of the Archives of American Art
Elfriede Abbe papers, 1840–1910 in the collection of the Cornell University Library

1919 births
2012 deaths
American engravers
American wood engravers
20th-century American sculptors
Cornell University College of Architecture, Art, and Planning alumni
Artists from Washington, D.C.
20th-century American women artists
American women printmakers
20th-century American printmakers
People from Manchester, Vermont
Women engravers
21st-century American women
20th-century engravers